HNoMS Sleipner was a 1. class gunboat built for the Royal Norwegian Navy. Like all other Norwegian gunships of her era, she carried a heavy armament on a diminutive hull. The vessel was built at the Naval Yard at Horten, and had yard number 56.

Fitout
Sleipner's main weapon was a 26 cm (10-inch) cannon, of the same make and model other navies mounted on battleships. Sleipner also carried an underwater torpedo tube in her bow for firing Whitehead torpedoes, and she was the first vessel in the Royal Norwegian Navy equipped with this weapon.

Rebuild

In 1900 Sleipner was rebuilt, and her masts and rigging removed. After her rebuild she was used as a cadet ship (training vessel) until 1915, when she started a new life as a floating barracks. Between 1921 and 1932 Sleipner was used as a floating depot for the fledgling Royal Norwegian Navy Air Service, before she was finally decommissioned and scrapped in 1935.

Notable crew
Elias Aslaksen, served as an officer cadet on board Sleipner in 1908.

Gallery

References

 Naval history via Flix: KNM Sleiner, retrieved 2 March 2006

 

Ships built in Horten
1.-class gunboats
1877 ships